Borgund Church is  a stone church from the 14th century in Ålesund, Norway.

Borgund Church may also refer to:
Borgund Church (Lærdal), a church consecrated in 1868 in Lærdal, Norway
Borgund Stave Church, a medieval stave church in Lærdal, Norway